Flow control may refer to:

 Flow control (data), in communications
 Ethernet flow control
 Flow control (fluid), in fluid dynamics
 Air traffic flow control

See also 
 Control flow, in computing